This Is Hell is the second album by the Swedish melodic death metal band Dimension Zero.

Glenn Ljungström left after the recording and before the album's release; he did not appear in the music video for "Immaculate".

Track listing 
 "The Introduction to What This Is" – 2:38
 "Dimension Zero" – 2:53
 "Immaculate" – 3:52
 "Blood on the Streets" – 3:09
 "Into and Out of Subsistence" – 3:09
 "The Final Destination" – 4:50
 "Amygdala" – 3:27
 "Killing My Sleep" – 4:01
 "This Light" – 4:28
 "Di'i Minores" – 3:52
 "Helmet" - 2:19 (bonus track for Japan/Korea)

Personnel
Jesper Strömblad - bass guitar, musical composition 
Glenn Ljungström - rhythm guitar, music
Jocke Göthberg - vocals, lyrics
Hans Nilsson - drums
Daniel Antonsson - lead guitar, musical composition

Dimension Zero (Swedish band) albums
2003 albums
Regain Records albums